Whitstable Pearl is a 2021 British crime drama television serial broadcast and produced by Acorn TV, based on a series of novels by Julie Wassmer.

Plot
Pearl Nolan, single mother of a grown son, is a private detective who, together with her mum, runs the Whitstable Pearl, a seafood restaurant in the coastal town of Whitstable. When a friend dies under suspicious circumstances, Pearl finds herself in conflict with gruff new-cop-in-town, detective Mike McGuire.

Cast and characters
Main
 Kerry Godliman as Pearl Nolan, single mum who runs the Whitstable Pearl
 Howard Charles as DCI Mike McGuire, a dour police detective who moves to Whitstable from London
 Frances Barber as Dolly Nolan, Pearl's widowed mother and co-manager of the Whitstable Pearl

Recurring
 Isobelle Molloy as Ruby Williams, waitress at the Whitstable Pearl
 Rohan Nedd as Charlie Nolan, Pearl's son
 Sophia Del Pizzo as Nikki Martel, detective sergeant in Whitstable

Episodes

Season 1 (2021)

Season 2 (2022)

Production
Whitstable Pearl was filmed in Kent from October 2020 to January 2021. The majority of the filming took place in Whitstable, including at the harbour, the yacht club, and the beach. Various scenes were also shot in Margate, the Port of Ramsgate, Dover, and Hernhill.

References

External links
 Whitstable Pearl on Acorn TV
 

Detective television series
Mystery television series
British police procedural television series
2020s British crime drama television series
2020s British mystery television series
British detective television series
English-language television shows
Television shows based on British novels
2021 British television series debuts
Television shows set in England